Phoebe Gertrude Stabler (née McLeish, 1879–1955) was an English artist working across many mediums including metalwork, pottery, enamel and wood in the late nineteenth and early-mid twentieth centuries. "Although Stabler is best known for her pottery figures, during the 1920s and 1930s she was also well known for her stone carvings and was an important contributor to the British Empire Exhibition at Wembley, 1924."

Biography 
Stabler was born in Birmingham, but grew up in Liverpool, where both her parents originated. Stabler was one of five or more children, with her two sisters also following creative careers as jewellery designers. Stabler first studied at the Liverpool School of Art in the 1890s, where two of her sisters also attended. During this time she was awarded the City Scholarship and Travelling Scholarship. She went on to study at the Royal College of Art in London.

Artwork 
In 1906, she married Harold Stabler. From 1912, Stabler and her husband, had a kiln in Hammersmith, London, where they worked collaboratively as well as Stabler producing garden ornaments. She created richly glazed pottery figures which were produced by both the Royal Worcester and Royal Doulton and Poole Pottery. For Poole Pottery, she collaborated with her husband to design the ceramics for The Cenotaph in Durban. Stabler also designed works for Ashtead Potters, a pottery that employed ex-servicemen after the First World War.

Stabler created the World's Land-Speed Trophy that was awarded to Sir Henry Segrave.

In 2018, The Light of Knowledge (1927) ceramic tile panel was put on display at the Rugby Art Gallery & Museum following a fundraising effort to have it restored.

Selected exhibitions 
Stabler's work was exhibited widely, including at the following institutes,

 Royal Glasgow Institute of the Fine Arts
 Society of Women Artists
 Royal Academy of Arts
 Walker Art Gallery
 Women's International Art Club
 Sir John Cass Arts and Crafts Society
 Arts and Crafts Exhibition Society
 British Institute of Industrial Art

Works held in Collections

References

External links 
 
 A short video showing Phoebe Stabler at work

1879 births
1955 deaths
19th-century British sculptors
20th-century British sculptors
19th-century English women artists
20th-century English women artists
Alumni of Liverpool John Moores University
Alumni of the Royal College of Art
Artists from Birmingham, West Midlands
Artists from Liverpool
English women sculptors
Sibling artists